
The following lists events that happened during 1812 in South Africa.

Events
 The settlement of Cradock is established
 The settlement of Grahamstown is founded
 The British troops stationed at the Cape along with settler militia drove the Xhosa from the Zuurveld, a district between the Sundays and the Great Fish Rivers, once again and thereby ending the 4th Cape Frontier War.

References

 Xhosa Wars#Third war .281799.E2.80.931803.29

See Years in South Africa for list of References

History of South Africa